†Mautodontha zebrina was a species of small air-breathing land snails, terrestrial pulmonate gastropod mollusks in the family Charopidae.

This species was endemic to the Cook Islands.  It is now extinct.

References

Mautodontha
Extinct gastropods
Taxonomy articles created by Polbot